McKeiver v. Pennsylvania, 403 U.S. 528 (1971), is a decision of the United States Supreme Court. The Court held that juveniles in juvenile criminal proceedings were not entitled to a jury trial by the Sixth or Fourteenth Amendments. The Court's plurality opinion left the precise reasoning for the decision unclear.

Background
Joseph McKeiver and Edward Terry were teenagers charged with acts of robbery, theft, assault, and escape. Both were denied a request for a jury trial at the Juvenile Court of Philadelphia. A state Superior Court affirmed the order and, after combining their separate cases into one case, the Supreme Court of Pennsylvania affirmed the decision stating that there is no constitutional right to a jury trial for juveniles. In similar cases, the Court of Appeals and Supreme Court of North Carolina both affirmed the lower court's decision, finding no constitutional requirement for a jury trial for juvenile defendants.

Decision of the U.S. Supreme Court
Although the right to a jury trial is not guaranteed by the U.S Constitution in these cases states may, and some do, employ jury trials in juvenile proceedings if they wish to do so. Kansas is the first state in the U.S. to articulate that the right should be extended to juveniles  under its state constitution.

See also
List of United States Supreme Court cases, volume 403

References

External links
 

United States Supreme Court cases
United States Supreme Court cases of the Burger Court
United States Sixth Amendment jury case law
1971 in United States case law
1971 in Pennsylvania
Juvenile justice system
Pennsylvania state courts